The HP-15C is a high-end scientific programmable calculator of Hewlett-Packard's Voyager series produced between 1982 and 1989.

Models

HP-15C
The HP-15C is a high-end scientific pocket calculator with a root-solver and numerical integration. A member of Hewlett-Packard Voyager series of programmable calculators, it was produced between 1982 and 1989. The calculator is able to handle complex numbers and matrix operations. Although out of production, its popularity has led to high prices on the used market. The HP-15C was a replacement for the HP-34C. The 15C used CMOS technology for its processor, resulting in very low power consumption.

HP 15c Limited Edition
After showing a prototype labelled "HP 15c+" at the HHC 2010, HP announced the HP 15c Limited Edition (NW250AA) on 1 September 2011. It is based on a flashable controller utilizing the same ARM7TDMI core already used in the 2008 revision of the 12C but in a different package, an Atmel AT91SAM7L128-AU running an emulator written by Cyrille de Brébisson to execute the old HP Nut code much faster than on the original hardware. The calculator was released alongside the HP 12c 30th Anniversary Edition. This model is powered by two CR2032 batteries, and can easily be differentiated from the original model by the "Limited Edition" script below the company logo as well as the black text on brushed metal back label, as opposed to the white text on black of the original.The power consumption of the processor is greater than that of the original HP-15C, as HP did not use the same technology in any of the future models.

Bugs and problems
HP-15C:
CHS stack lift bug (and fix)
The non-responsive reset procedure documented in the 15C manual had the side effect of rotating the X register by 22 bits which could then be used to perform synthetic programming. 

HP-15c Limited Edition:

 One of the more significant bugs in the released firmware version (dated 2011-04-15 in the self-test) is that PSE only works once in a program and subsequently blanks the display until the program stops or is stopped. Downgrading the firmware resolves the PSE bug, however, other bugs will also be reintroduced.
 The original HP-15C self-test keystrokes do not work with the HP-15C LE and can corrupt memory contents. The original manual did not include the new self-test procedure.

Legacy

Emulators
An official PC emulator for the 15C is available as freeware from Hewlett-Packard. Another version is commercially available for Android and iOS devices.

Clones
On 6 February 2012, SwissMicros (previously known as RPN-Calc) introduced a miniature clone named DM-15CC approximating the size of an ID-1 credit card (88 mm × 59 mm × 7 mm). It closely emulates the functionality of the original HP-15C by running the original ROM image in an emulator on an ARM Cortex-M0-based NXP LPC1114 processor. Newer DM15 models feature a better keyboard and more RAM (LPC1115). With a modified firmware (M80 and M1B), the additional memory allows for up to 129 or even 230 registers and up to 1603 or 896 programs steps. A DM15 Silver Edition in a titanium case is available as well in three color variants (metal, brown, blue). Deviating from the original, these calculators feature a dot-matrix display, switchable fonts and clock speeds, and, based on a Silicon Labs CP2102 converter chip, they come with a USB (Mini-B) serial interface to exchange data with a PC etc. for backup purposes and possibly to communicate with applications (like PC-based HP-15C emulators) or to update the firmware. In September 2015, SwissMicros introduced the DM15L, a version of the calculator about the same size as the original HP-15C. It still comes with a USB Mini-B connector. Powering via USB is not supported.

See also
 List of Hewlett-Packard products: Pocket calculators
 HP calculators

References

Further reading

External links
 
 
 

15C